Eren-Verdi Asrin (publicly known as Eren Legend) is a Canadian born Men’s Physique “world champion” and celebrity personal trainer based in Los Angeles, CA. Eren earned the title of Canada's first Men’s Physique “Mr. World Physique” in 2014 Montreal, Canada.

Since, he has gone on to represent Canada as an International Federation of Bodybuilding Pro Athlete at the Mr. Olympia Showdown in 2015, Las Vegas where he finished in 16th place (tied).

Eren is recognized also for his many public live television appearances on local news as well as securing the cover of over 15+ fitness and modeling magazines.

Early life and education 
Eren was born and raised in his native country, Canada, where he started his passion for athletics at the age of 10. He had always had an athletic upbringing with a focus in soccer and hockey. Eren later went on to find a passion in boxing and weight training.

He enrolled in Business Administration at Algonquin College in Ottawa, Canada, but quickly dropped out in his first semester. Upon this, he enrolled in Fitness and Health Promotion graduating and earning his diploma in 2013.

Career 
At Free Form Fitness, Eren was encouraged to compete in Physique competitions. Erin went on to qualify as a National Level Athlete within 1 week of competition.

He earned the title of “Mr. World Physique”, the first ever for Canada, and in the same competition was able to earn his Professional Athlete status.

Eren later went on to win the Vancouver Pro Show, a Professional level competition which earned him the opportunity to represent Canada at the Mr. Olympia Showdown.

Eren has since retired from competition and has shifted his focus into fashion design with his Legend Fitted apparel line.

Eren has appeared on live local television as an expert offering health advice and has recently been recognized by GQ Magazine as a contributor for fitness, health and wellness.

References 

1990 births
Living people
Sportspeople from Ottawa
Algonquin College alumni
Canadian bodybuilders